Kanthaya may refer to:

Kanthaya, Banmauk -Burma
Kanthaya, Okpho-Burma